Waterbomb for the Fat Tomcat is a 2004 Latvian/Estonian Latvian language film directed by Varis Brasla, starring Baiba Broka, Jānis Paukštello, and Artūrs Skrastiņš.

The film was awarded the Latvian National Film Prize Lielais Kristaps in 2005 as the best film of the year. In 2004 it also received award in Chicago International Children's Film Festival as the best live-action feature film or video.

Cast 
Baiba Broka — Una
Undīne Vīksne — Marta
Zane Leimane — Linda
Gundars Āboliņš — Ivo
Jānis Paukštello — Grandfather
Agita Gruntmane-Valtere — Mother
Tõnu Kark — Dog owner
Elmārs Viļums — Edgars
Leonarda Kļaviņa-Ķestere — Edgars' mother
Artūrs Skrastiņš — Father

External links 
 

2004 films
Latvian children's films